Natalya Valeryevna Zhedik (born 11 July 1988) is a Russian professional basketball player. She plays for Nadezhda Orenburg from RPL and the Russia women's national basketball team and competed in the 2012 Summer Olympics.

References

1988 births
Living people
Basketball players at the 2012 Summer Olympics
Olympic basketball players of Russia
Russian women's basketball players
Basketball players from Saint Petersburg
Shooting guards